Wikimania is the Wikimedia movement's annual conference, organized by volunteers and hosted by the Wikimedia Foundation. Topics of presentations and discussions include Wikimedia projects such as Wikipedia, other wikis, open-source software, free knowledge and free content, and social and technical aspects related to these topics.

Since 2011, the winner of the Wikimedian of the Year award (known as the "Wikipedian of the Year" until 2017) has been announced at Wikimania.

Overview

Conferences

2005 

Wikimania 2005, the first Wikimania conference, was held from 4 to 8 August 2005 at the Haus der Jugend in Frankfurt, Germany, attracting about 380 attendees.

The week of the conference included four "Hacking Days", from 1 to 4 August, when some 25 developers gathered to work on code and discuss the technical aspects of MediaWiki and of running the Wikimedia projects. The main days of the conference, despite its billing as being "August 4–8", were Friday to Sunday of that week, from 5 to 7 August. Presentation sessions were scheduled all day during those three days.

Keynote speakers included Jimmy Wales, Ross Mayfield, Ward Cunningham, and Richard Stallman (who spoke on "Copyright and community in the age of computer networks"). The majority of sessions and conversations were in English, although a few were in German.

Sponsors of the event included Answers.com, SocialText, Sun Microsystems, and Logos Group.

2006 

Wikimania 2006, the second Wikimania conference, was held from 6 to 8 August 2006 at Harvard Law School's Berkman Center for Internet & Society in Cambridge in Massachusetts, United States, with about 400–500 attendees.

Speakers included Wales, Lawrence Lessig, Brewster Kahle, Yochai Benkler, Mitch Kapor, Ward Cunningham, and David Weinberger. Dan Gillmor held a citizen journalism unconference the day after.

Wales' plenary speech was covered by the Associated Press, and printed in numerous worldwide newspapers. He chronicled how the Foundation evolved from him "sitting in his pajamas" to the maturing corporate structure that it is now; the frequent push for quality over quantity; Wikipedia will be included on computers distributed through One Laptop per Child; both Wikiversity and the creation of an advisory board were approved by the Foundation board; and that Wiki-WYG is in development thanks to private investment by Wikia, Inc. and Socialtext.

Answers.com was the Wikimania 2006 patron sponsor, while Amazon.com, the Berkman Center for Internet & Society at Harvard Law School, Nokia, WikiHow were Benefactors-level sponsors, Wetpaint, Ask.com, Yahoo!, and Socialtext were Friends-level sponsors, and IBM, FAQ Farm, Elevation Partners, One Laptop per Child, and the Sunlight Foundation were Supporter-level sponsors of the conference.

Three other teams submitted hosting bids, for the cities of London, Milan, Boston, and Toronto; only Toronto and Boston were passed to the second round of consideration by Wikimania organizers. In Toronto's case the event would have been hosted in the University of Toronto's Bahen Centre.

2007 

As announced on 25 September 2006, Wikimania 2007, the third Wikimania conference, was held from 3 to 5 August 2007 in Taipei, Taiwan. It was the first Wikimania event to hold a volunteer training course.

Three other teams submitted hosting bids, for the cities of London, Alexandria, and Turin. Bids for Hong Kong, Singapore, Istanbul, and Orlando failed to make the shortlist. The winner was announced on 25 September 2006.

On 3 August 2007, New York Times reporter Noam Cohen reported: "The conference has attracted about 440 attendees, a little more than half from Taiwan, who want to immerse themselves for three days in the ideas and issues that come up making an entirely volunteer-written encyclopedia. The workshops cover practical topics like how to collaborate peacefully; what importance to give 'expertise' in a project that is celebrated for allowing anyone to contribute, including anonymous editors".

2008 

Wikimania 2008, the fourth Wikimania conference, was held from 17 to 19 July 2008 at the Bibliotheca Alexandrina in Alexandria, Egypt, with 650 attendees from 45 countries. Alexandria was the location of the ancient Library of Alexandria. Three proposed cities were in the running at the end, the other two being Atlanta and Cape Town. Proposals for Karlsruhe, London and Toronto were also submitted, but later withdrew. There was a controversy about the conference, and even a call to boycott Wikimania 2008 because of Egypt's alleged censorship and imprisoning of bloggers during Mubarak's era. Mohamed Ibrahim, a graduate of Alexandria University who worked to bring the conference to Alexandria, told the BBC "I think we have the right to develop and to make freedom of expression on a larger scale." One of his goals was to help grow Arabic Wikipedia which he contributes to since early 2005. An Egyptian cabinet minister spoke at the opening ceremonies on Mubarak's behalf.

2009 

The  fifth Wikimania conference was held from 26 to 28 August 2009 in Buenos Aires, with 559 attendees. Brisbane, Karlsruhe, and Toronto were also considered as host cities.

2010 

The sixth Wikimania conference was held from 9 to 11 July at the Polish Baltic Philharmonic in Gdańsk, Poland. The starting day on July 9 overlapped with the end of the WikiSym academic conference. Bids for Amsterdam and Oxford lost by a small margin. Wikimania 2010 was the first conference which included a big focus on the cultural aspects of the hosting nation, particularly a concert of a philharmonic orchestra, celebrating the tenth anniversary of the death of the most important contemporary Polish composer Władysław Szpilman and the premiere of the film Truth in Numbers?. At the conference, WMF executive director Sue Gardner said the foundation aimed to grow the number of visitors to Wikimedia sites from 371 million to 680 million a month, over the next five years.

2011 
Wikimania 2011, the seventh Wikimania conference, was held from 4 to 7 August 2011 in Haifa, Israel. The conference venue was the Haifa Auditorium and adjoining Beit Hecht cultural center on Mount Carmel. Keynote speakers at the conference included Yochai Benkler, a fellow at the Berkman Center for Internet and Society at Harvard University and Joseph M. Reagle Jr. of MIT, author of Good Faith Collaboration: The Culture of Wikipedia. Head of the Science and Technology Committee at the Knesset, Meir Sheetrit, also spoke at the conference, as did Yonah Yahav, the Mayor of Haifa. One of the sponsors of the event was Haifa University. The conference featured 125 sessions in five simultaneous tracks and was attended by 720 Wikimedians from 56 different countries, including some that have no diplomatic relations with Israel.

In an interview with Haaretz, Wales noted that there had been boycott calls against the conference in Israel, as there had been against having it in Egypt in 2008. He said that despite conflicts among editors on the Israel-Palestinian conflict, and efforts by a pro-Israel group to recruit more Wikipedia editors, he believes Wikipedia articles largely remained neutral on the topic; he stated "NPOV is non-negotiable."

Wikimedia Foundation executive director Sue Gardner spoke to the conference about the Western, male-dominated mind-set characterizing Wikipedia. At the end of the August 7 closing ceremony, Wales was presented with the first day cover of the first-ever Wikimedia-related postal stamp, issued by the Israeli postal service in honor of the event. Among new projects discussed was collaboration with cultural institutions such as galleries, libraries, archives and museums.

After the conference, participants were offered a free tour of Haifa, Jerusalem, Nazareth or Acre. Shay Yakir, outgoing chairman of Wikimedia Israel, said that for Israel, holding the conference in Haifa was like hosting the Olympic Games.

2012 

Wikimania 2012, the eighth Wikimania conference, was held from 12 to 15 July 2012 at George Washington University in Washington, D.C., with over 1,400 attendees from 87 countries. In conjunction with the conference, the U.S. Department of State hosted Tech@State:Wiki.Gov, which focused on "collaborative knowledge and the use of wikis in the public sector". Prominent conference themes were the need to update the old and "dowdy" interface with new Wikimedia tools in order to attract and retain more editors and to make Wikimedia sites more inviting and friendly to users, including especially women. The Atlantic featured charts displayed at the conference which showed how the number of new administrators has dropped precipitously over the last few years.

During the opening plenary, Wales commented on Wikipedia blackout of January 2012, stating "When I go and visit government officials now, they’re a little bit afraid." However he reiterated Wikimedia's commitment to political neutrality except regarding "the most serious things that directly impact our work." Wales agreed with keynote speaker Mary Gardiner, co-founder of the Ada Initiative, that Wikimedia had to do more to increase the number of women editors. She said, "As a project of social change, even if it's not an activist project, the Wikipedia community has a responsibility both to its mission and to the people out there in the world to always be on a journey toward diversity — to increase the size of the umbrella of the world."

2013 

Wikimania 2013, the ninth Wikimania conference, was held from 7 to 11 August 2013 at The Hong Kong Polytechnic University, with 700 attendees from 88 countries. Candidate cities were London (UK), Bristol (UK), Naples (Italy) and Surakarta (Indonesia). One of the parties for the event was held at the International Commerce Centre and the closing party was held at Shek O Beach. Topics discussed included Wikipedia's gender disparity and Wales' proposal for Wikipedia to begin using Secure Sockets Layer to encrypt its pages.

2014 

Wikimania 2014, the tenth Wikimania conference, was held from 8 to 10 August 2014 at the Barbican Centre in London. Bidding officially opened in December 2012. London was chosen in May 2013 as the host city with the only other bid coming from Arusha (Tanzania). The keynote address was given by Salil Shetty, Secretary General of Amnesty International. The event was the first Wikimania addressed by the Wikimedia Foundation's new executive director Lila Tretikov, and was preceded by a two-day hackathon, and a series of fringe events. The conference was documented by the television program 60 Minutes in a program titled 'Wikimania'.

2015

Wikimania 2015, the eleventh Wikimania conference, was held from 15 to 19 July 2015 at the Hotel Hilton Mexico City Reforma in Mexico City. Bidding officially opened in December 2013. Other candidate cities were: Arusha, northern Tanzania; Bali, a province in Indonesia; Cape Town, in South Africa; Dar es Salaam, in Tanzania; Esino Lario, province of Lecco, Lombardy, Italy; and Monastir, in Tunisia.  Shortlisted were Mexico City, Cape Town and Monastir.  Mexico City was selected in April 2014. The organising entity was Wikimedia México, A.C., the Mexican local chapter representing the interests and goals of the Wikimedia Foundation.

2016

Wikimania 2016, the twelfth Wikimania conference, took place from 24 to 26 June 2016, with peripheral events from 21 to 28 June, in the mountain village of Esino Lario, Italy. Esino Lario had bid unsuccessfully for the 2015 Wikimania. The other candidate city that bid for the 2016 hosting was Manila, Philippines. The venue is the first that is not a major city and plenary sessions are in the outdoor venue. During the event, it was announced that the Wikimedia Foundation's interim executive director Katherine Maher was appointed permanently.

2017

Wikimania 2017, the thirteenth Wikimania conference, was held at Le Centre Sheraton Hotel in Montreal, Quebec, Canada, from 9 to 13 August 2017. The event was held in Canada during its sesquicentennial anniversary and in Montreal during its 375th anniversary. The first two days included WikiConference North America.

2018
Wikimania 2018, the fourteenth Wikimania conference, was held in Cape Town, South Africa, from 18 to 22 July 2018 at the Cape Sun Southern Sun Hotel. It was the first time the event had a theme. The theme was "Bridging Knowledge gaps: the Ubuntu way forward" with the aim of focusing discussion on building shared strategies to bridge the collective knowledge gaps.

2019

Wikimania 2019, the fifteenth Wikimedia conference, was held in Stockholm, Sweden, from 14 to 18 August 2019, at the Stockholm University, with an attendance of over 800. The event centered around the theme Stronger Together: Wikimedia, Free Knowledge and the Sustainable Development Goals. As part of the movement's sustainability initiative, Wikimedia Sverige and the Wikimedia Foundation decided to pay half of the carbon offsetting cost.  Terrapass, sponsored the other half of the offsetting for the conference. Emna Mizouni was named the Wikimedian of the year.

2020–2022 

The sixteenth Wikimania conference was scheduled to be held in Bangkok from 5 to 9 August 2020, coinciding with the 15th anniversary of the event. In March 2020, due to the COVID-19 pandemic, Maher announced a postponement until 2021. On January 28, 2021, WMF chief operating officer Janeen Uzzell announced Wikimania would be moving to a virtual event as the ongoing pandemic affected planning for an in-person event. The 2021 edition took place between August 13 and 17, 2021. The scheduled in-person event would have been hosted by Wikimedia ESEAP (East, Southeast Asia and the Pacific), a first time for a regional collaborative. It would have been the third time it will be held in Asia and first for Southeast Asia. ESEAP will be given a chance to host Wikimania's next in-person edition.

Wikimania 2022 was again an online event but with the waning of the pandemic some cities had in-person events.

2023 
Wikimania 2023 will be held in Singapore and online from 16–19 August, 2023. It will be the first returning in-person event since 2019 and will be organized by Wikimedia ESEAP.

See also
Wiki Indaba conference in Africa
Wiki Conference India
WikiConference North America
WikiSym

References

External links

 Wikimania at Meta-Wiki, a Wikimedia project coordination wiki.

News reports
 "Worldwide Wikimania" Sean Dodson, The Guardian, 11 August 2005.
 "Rewriting the rule books" Alan Connor, the BBC, 15 August 2005.
 "The Many Voices of Wikipedia, Heard in One Place" Robert Levine, The New York Times, 7 August 2006.
 "Anybody can edit: A weekend of Wikimania" Ian Sands and Jess McConnell, The Boston Phoenix, 11 August 2006.
 "The Neutrality of this Article is Disputed" Katherine Mangu-Ward, Reason, 15 August 2006.
 The China Post – "Wikipedia founder rewards volunteers" Monday, August 6, 2007 – by Dimitri Bruyas.
 "Wikimedia fans meet to discuss Wikimania" Andy Goldberg, News.com.au, 12 July 2012 1:37AM (retrieved 2012-07-15).
 "How Kate Middleton’s Wedding Gown Demonstrates Wikipedia’s Woman Problem" Torie Bosch, The Slate posted Friday, 13 July 2012, at 18:12 PM EDT (retrieved 2012-07-15).
 "Wikimania hits D.C. as Wikipedia faces changes" Hayley Tsukayama, The Washington Post, 14 July 2012.

Annual events
Articles containing video clips
Recurring events established in 2005
Web-related conferences
Wikimedia Foundation
Wiki-related conferences